Roman Griffin Davis (born 5 March 2007) is a British actor. He is best known for his title role in the film Jojo Rabbit (2019), for which he was nominated for a Golden Globe.

Early life and career
Roman Griffin Davis was born on 5 March 2007 in London. He is the son of cinematographer Ben Davis and writer-director Camille Griffin. He lives with his parents and brothers, twins Gilby and Hardy, in East Sussex. He went to school at Cumnor House, Sussex, until 2020. Davis made his acting debut in the 2019 satirical black comedy film Jojo Rabbit directed by Taika Waititi. His twin brothers are also in the film as Hitler Youth clones. Davis was nominated for six awards for his performance in Jojo Rabbit and won two, the Critics' Choice Movie Award for Best Young Performer and the Washington D.C. Area Film Critics Association Award for Best Breakthrough Performance. He starred in the 2021 comedy Silent Night directed by his mother Camille Griffin.

Filmography

Awards

References

External links
 

2007 births
Living people
21st-century English male actors
English male child actors
English male film actors
Male actors from London